Cæsar Peter Møller Boeck (28 September 1845 – 17 March 1917) was a Norwegian dermatologist born in Lier, Norway.  He was a nephew to dermatologist Carl Wilhelm Boeck (1808-1875) and zoologist Christian Peder Bianco Boeck (1798-1877). 

In 1871 he graduated from the Christiania (Oslo) Medical School, and did post-graduate work in Vienna under Ferdinand von Hebra (1816-1880). In 1889 he was appointed chief of dermatology at the Rikshospitalet in Kristiania, later becoming an associate professor (1895).

A specialist in histological research, Boeck is remembered for describing a granulomatous disease that affects the lymph nodes, as well as other parts of the body. In 1899 he provided a comprehensive description of skin changes along with general lymph node destruction that was associated with the disease. The condition was later named Boeck's sarcoidosis, and is sometimes referred to as "Besnier-Boeck-Schaumann disease" (named in conjunction with Ernest Henri Besnier and Jörgen Nilsen Schaumann). Boeck published his findings of the disorder in an article titled "Multiple benign sarcoid of the skin". 

Boeck was a fluent speaker of German, English and French, and travelled extensively throughout Europe during his career. He was an aficionado of art, and spent much of his free time in art museums. In 1917 he published a treatise on Rembrandt called Rembrandt og Saskia i deres hjem (Rembrandt and Saskia in their home). In his will he donated his art collection to the Drammen city museum.

He was co-founder of the magazine Tidsskrift for praktisk Medicin (1881–1886).

References 
 Cæsar Peter Møller Boeck @ Who Named It
 Sarcoidosis Networking Sarcoidosis and Naturopathic Care

Norwegian dermatologists
1845 births
1917 deaths
People from Lier, Norway
Academic staff of the University of Oslo
Oslo University Hospital people